David Barnett Kogan  (born September 1957) is a British media executive, historian and journalist, living in London. He has worked as both a journalist and a senior executive at the BBC, Reuters Television, Granada Channels, Wasserman Media Group and Magnum Photos. He has written about the history of the Labour Party.

Career
Kogan was educated at Haverstock Comprehensive School in Camden, London; and at Balliol College, Oxford.

From 1982 he was a producer at BBC Radio working on Today; at BBC Television working on Newsnight and Breakfast Time; and at BBC America. From 1988 he was managing editor and then global managing director at Reuters Television. From 1996 he was executive director at Granada Channels. In 1998 he co-founded media advisory company Reel Enterprises with Sara Munds, and was its Chief executive officer (CEO). In 2011, Reel was acquired by Wasserman Media Group, where Kogan and Munds went to work in media rights. In 2014 he and Munds left and set up Exile Enterprises. Kogan was executive director / CEO of Magnum Photos from 2015 to 2019.

Kogan was "the Premier League's chief media rights adviser from 1998 to 2015 and a key architect of its global financial success". Other media rights clients have included the English Football League, Premiership Rugby, the International Olympic Committee and the National Football League (NFL). He was awarded an OBE in the Queen's 2014 Birthday Honours for services to diplomacy, having been asked to provide advice on FCO Services funds. While at Magnum in 2018, prompted by allegations of sexual misconduct against two of its photographers, Kogan led the agency in creating a formal code of conduct for both its photographers and staff.

Kogan's first book was The Battle for the Labour Party, published with his uncle, Maurice Kogan, in 1981. The later Protest and Power: The Battle for the Labour Party (2019) is a 400-page book that builds on the earlier work, based on many interviews. William Davies described the latter work in The Guardian as a "meticulous review of four decades of intra-party struggles" up to February 2019.

In April 2020 Kogan became a director of LabourList, an independent news site for the Labour Party.

Publications
The Battle for the Labour Party. 1981. With Maurice Kogan.
Second, updated edition. Fontana, 1982. . Contains 2 additional chapters.
London: Bloomsbury Reader, 2018. .
The Attack on Higher Education. London: Kogan Page, 1983. .
Protest and Power: The Battle for the Labour Party. London: Bloomsbury Reader, 2019. .

References

Writers from London
British male writers
British television executives
20th-century British historians
21st-century British historians
Alumni of Balliol College, Oxford
Living people
1957 births
Place of birth missing (living people)